Andrei Chindriș (born 12 January 1999) is a Romanian professional footballer who plays as a centre-back for Liga I club UTA Arad.

Club career
On 25 November 2016, top flight side Botoșani announced the signing of Chindriș from the academy of Universitatea Cluj. He was loaned out to Academica Clinceni at the start of the following year, and for the 2017–18 season joined Știința Miroslava also on loan, with both teams competing in the Liga II.

Chindriș amassed eleven Liga I games in the first campaign upon his return in Botoșani, after which he became a regular starter at the club. In August 2021, he transferred to Santa Clara in Portugal for an undisclosed fee. He made his debut on 26 October by opening a 3–1 victory over Porto in the League Cup third round.

International career
Chindriș was called up by manager Adrian Mutu for the 2021 UEFA European Under-21 Championship, but did not play in any match as Romania failed to progress from the group stage. Also during that year, he represented Romania under-23 at the 2020 Summer Olympics in Japan. Chindriș made one appearance in a final goalless draw with New Zealand which resulted in another group-stage exit.

Career statistics

Club

References

External links

1999 births
Living people
Sportspeople from Cluj-Napoca
Romanian emigrants to Spain
Romanian footballers
Association football defenders
Liga I players
Liga II players
Primeira Liga players
FC Botoșani players
LPS HD Clinceni players
CS Știința Miroslava players
C.D. Santa Clara players
Romania under-21 international footballers
Olympic footballers of Romania
Footballers at the 2020 Summer Olympics
Romanian expatriate footballers
Expatriate footballers in Portugal
Romanian expatriate sportspeople in Portugal